Proceratophrys avelinoi is a species of frog in the family Odontophrynidae.
It is found in Argentina, Brazil, and possibly Paraguay.
Its natural habitats are subtropical or tropical moist lowland forest, rivers, intermittent rivers, pastureland, and heavily degraded former forest.
It is threatened by habitat loss.

References

Proceratophrys
Amphibians of Argentina
Amphibians of Brazil
Taxonomy articles created by Polbot
Amphibians described in 1993